"Girls Just Shauna Have Fun" is the 19th episode of the 33rd season of the American animated television series The Simpsons, and the 725th episode overall. It aired in the United States on Fox on May 1, 2022. The episode was directed by Matthew Nastuk and written by Jeff Westbrook.

Plot

Lisa is selected as a replacement saxophonist for the high school marching band where she discovers to her surprise that Shauna shares a similar passion for music. While Lisa and Shauna form a new bond, Homer finds himself bonding with Shauna's father when Superintendent Chalmers introduces him to the ancient craft of Trappist beer brewing.

Reception
Tony Sokol of Den of Geek gave the episode a 4 out of 5 stars stating, "’Girls Just Shauna Have Fun’ is a fun episode, loaded with emotional bits, one liners, and visual gags, like Mouth Mistake Hot Sauce. It is an original plot, which moves naturally, with effective overall character development. It also lets Shauna get off without a warning."

Marcus Gibson of Bubbleblabber gave the episode an 6/10 stating, "Overall, ’Girls Just Shauna Have Fun’ is a fitting episode dedicated to Lisa's passion for playing music. However, it later succumbs to the ordinary high school tropes it's satirizing. As a result, it became a mildly uninspired episode filled with predictable elements and Lisa's unlikable ’big sister'. It isn't without a few chuckle-worthy moments, including a nod to James Corden's Late Late Show and a visual gag involving a movie that somehow reminds me of the 2019 film ’Five Feet Apart’. Other than that, this episode is nowhere near as fun as I thought it would be."

References

2022 American television episodes
The Simpsons (season 33) episodes